Rasse may refer to:

Small Indian civet
Masaki Okimoto, Japanese professional wrestler, whose stage name is Rasse
 Rasse (typeface), a foundry type made by Ludwig & Mayer.